Donald George May (15 February 1924 – 23 September 2001) was an Australian politician who was a Labor Party member of the Legislative Assembly of Western Australia from 1962 to 1965 and again from 1968 to 1977. He was a minister in the government of John Tonkin.

Early life
May was born in Collie, Western Australia, to Elizabeth Lyall (née Wilson) and Henry Thomas May. His mother was the daughter of Arthur Wilson, a long-serving Labor MP, and his father was the Labor member for Collie-Preston from 1947 to 1968. May was sent to school in Perth, attending Perth Boys' School and Perth Technical College. He worked as a coal miner and a railway clerk after leaving school, and in 1943 enlisted in the Australian Army, serving in the Pacific as a private with the 2/2nd Commando Squadron. Upon his return to Australia he secured work as a public relations officer with Western Australian Government Railways.

Politics
A member of the Labor Party since 1941, May stood for parliament at the 1962 state election, winning the seat of Canning by a narrow margin. He and his father consequently became the first father–son pair to sit together in the Legislative Assembly. At the 1965 election, the result in Canning was reversed, with May narrowly being defeated by sports journalist Ross Elliott, the Liberal Party candidate. He returned to parliament at the 1968 election as the member for the new seat of Clontarf, located in Perth's southern suburbs.

May increased his majority at the 1971 election and was appointed Minister for Mines and Minister for the North-West in the new Labor government led by John Tonkin. In a reshuffle only a few months after his initial appointment, he lost the North-West portfolio to Herb Graham, but was instead created Minister for Electricity. In July 1972, he also replaced Arthur Bickerton as Minister for Fuel. The Tonkin government was defeated at the 1974 election, but May remained a member of the Tonkin shadow cabinet, and later the shadow cabinet of Colin Jamieson, who replaced Tonkin as leader in 1976. He left parliament at the 1977 election, and worked for a period as chief industrial personnel officer of CBH Group, a grain growers' cooperative. May died in September 2001, aged 77. He married twice, having three children by his first wife.

See also
 Tonkin Ministry (Western Australia)
 Tonkin Shadow Ministry

References

|-

|-

1924 births
2001 deaths
Australian Army soldiers
Australian Labor Party members of the Parliament of Western Australia
Australian Army personnel of World War II
Australian people of English descent
Members of the Western Australian Legislative Assembly
People from Collie, Western Australia
20th-century Australian politicians
Energy Ministers of Western Australia